The Eubank Landfill Solar Array is a photovoltaic power station in Albuquerque, New Mexico that consists of 1.0 MWAC of concentrator photovoltaics (CPV) and 1.0 MWAC of flat-panel silicon photovoltaics (PV).  It is the only utility-scale CPV system utilizing Suncore third-generation technology that is operational and grid-connected in the US.   A portion of the output is being sold to PNM under a Power Purchase Agreement.

Facility details

The facility was constructed by Suncore and Bixby Electric starting in 2012 on a former landfill near EMCORE's corporate headquarters in the Sandia Science and Technology Park.  Suncore Photovoltaics Technology Co, Ltd, was founded in 2010 as a joint-venture company by Chinese LED optoelectronics manufacturer San'an Optoelectronics Co, Ltd (60%) and U.S. semiconductor manufacturer EMCORE Corporation (40%).  EMCORE was also purchasing part of the facility's output for its local administrative and manufacturing operations.

The 1.21 MWp (1.0 MWAC) concentrator photovoltaics (CPV) portion of the facility consists of 48 dual-axis Suncore CPV-Gen3.5 solar tracking systems divided into 2 sections.  The 24 systems of each section are connected in parallel to a central grid-connected 500 kW SatCon inverter.  Each system supports 56 DDM-1090X CPV modules which are each rated to produce 450 Wp.  Each module contains 15 fresnel lenses to concentrate sunlight 1090 times onto approximately 1 cm2 multi-junction solar cells which were locally developed and manufactured by EMCORE, allowing 28% module efficiency which is greater than other photovoltaic power plants.

The Gen3.5 tracker system is especially notable for its tilt and roll design,  which is unique among the trackers used by other CPV vendors.   The same system is utilized at the 1.26 MWp Evora Landfill facility in Portugal, and at Suncore's 138 MWp Golmud CPV Solar Park,  the largest CPV power station in the world.

Electricity production

See also

 Golmud CPV Solar Park
 Hatch Solar Energy Center
 Renewable energy in the United States
 Renewable portfolio standard
 Solar power in the United States

References

External links
  VIDEO: Eubank Landfill Solar Array - Aerial and Ground Footage
 Suncore Brochure 

Energy infrastructure completed in 2013
Solar power stations in New Mexico
Photovoltaic power stations in the United States